The A107 is an A road in London, England.  It runs from Whitechapel to Hackney.

Known as Mare Street for much of its length, it crosses the Regent's Canal near the Ash Grove Bus Garage.

References

Roads in England